The year 2000 is the fourth year in the history of M-1 Global, a mixed martial arts promotion based in Russia. In 2000 M-1 Global held 3 events beginning with, M-1 MFC: European Championship 2000.

Events list

M-1 MFC: European Championship 2000

M-1 MFC: European Championship 2000 was an event held on April 9, 2000 at The Palace of Sport Jubileiny in Saint Petersburg, Russia.

Results

M-1 MFC: CIS Cup 2000 Final

M-1 MFC: CIS Cup 2000 Final was an event held on September 11, 2000 in Sochi, Russia.

Results

M-1 MFC: World Championship 2000

M-1 MFC: World Championship 2000 was an event held on November 11, 2000 at The Palace of Sport Jubileiny in Saint Petersburg, Russia.

Results

See also 
 M-1 Global

References

M-1 Global events
2000 in mixed martial arts